Vila Boa may refer to the following places:

Brazil
 Vila Boa, Goiás, a municipality in the State of Goiás

Portugal
 Vila Boa (Barcelos), a civil parish in the municipality of Barcelos
 Vila Boa (Mirandela), a civil parish in the municipality of Mirandela 
 Vila Boa (Sabugal), a civil parish in the municipality of Sabugal
Other variants
 Vila Boa de Ousilhão, a parish in the municipality of Vinhais 
 Vila Boa de Quires, a parish in the municipality of Marco de Canaveses
 Vila Boa do Bispo, a parish in the municipality of Marco de Canaveses
 Vila Boa do Mondego, a parish in the municipality of Celorico da Beira